The Mary Anne Wales House, also known as The Briar-Patch, is a historic house on Snow Hill Road in Dublin, New Hampshire. Built in 1886, it is a well-preserved local example of the Shingle style, and an early residence of the town's late 19th-century summer resort colony. The house was listed on the National Register of Historic Places in 1983.

Description and history
The Mary Anne Wales House is located between Dublin's village center and Dublin Pond, on the ridge of Snow Hill east of Snow Hill Road a short way south of New Hampshire Route 101. The house is sited to afford commanding views to both the east and west, with views of the pond and nearby mountains. It is a -story frame structure, with a gambrel roof and shingled exterior. Its basic rectangular form is augmented by a variety of projections, including a polygonal two-story bay on the west (front) facade, and a two-story porch on the south side.

The house was built in 1886 for Miss Mary Anne Wales of Boston, Massachusetts, who had been summering in Dublin for twenty years before having this house built. The property also includes a barn from the same period, a "stable house" built in 1934, and a studio built in 1959. Owners of the house have played host to a number of notable musicians, including conductor Serge Koussevitsky and violinist Jascha Heifetz.

See also
National Register of Historic Places listings in Cheshire County, New Hampshire

References

Houses on the National Register of Historic Places in New Hampshire
Houses completed in 1886
Queen Anne architecture in New Hampshire
Shingle Style houses
Houses in Dublin, New Hampshire
National Register of Historic Places in Dublin, New Hampshire
Shingle Style architecture in New Hampshire